Lublin cuisine is an umbrella term for all dishes with a specific regional identity belonging to the region of Lublin. It is a subtype of Polish and Galician cuisine with many similarities to and signs of the influence of neighbouring cuisines.

List of Lublin dishes

Pastry and baked goods

 Bułka wiejska – lightly salted bread roll
 Całuski pszczelowolskie – small, oval biscuits with honey and beeswax 
 Cebulak żukowski – yeast dough with cheese-onion stuffing 
 Cebularz lubelski – wheat flat-cake topped with onion and poppy seed
 Golasy izbickie – originating from Gmina Izbica; stuffed with buckwheat, boiled potatoes with cheese and śmietana
 Gryczak janowski – buckwheat grain with milk
 Gryczok godziszowski – grain with sugar, white cheese
 Korowaj – traditional wedding bread, served to the bride the day before marriage
 Paszteciki niedrzwickie z kapustą i pieczarkami – pasty with mushroom and cabbage
 Paszteciki z grzybami (mushroom pasty) – mushroom pasty
 Pączki żakowolskie z powidłami z antonówek – originating from Żakowola; pączki with yeast dough and apple filling
Piernik lubelski (Lublin gingerbread) – two-layer sponge-fat cake, lightly sweet with an aromatic root smell
 Piernik żydowski (Jewish gingerbread) – sponge-fat cake, topped with dried tropical fruit
 Pieróg biłgorajski, piróg biłgorajski (Biłgoraj pierogi) – roast with Kasza, potato, twaróg, eggs and śmietana
 Racuchy turowskie – oval, puffy yeast cake
 Racuchy z makiem (racuchy with poppy-seed) – poppy seed-yeast cake
 Wafle tortowe suche (dry cake waffles) – waffles; dry and crumbly, with a lightly sweet taste
 Zawijaki wygnanowskie – "twist" with fruit, yeast dough and fruit

Soups

 Jabłczanka z Fajsławic – dried apple soup with śmietana and sugar
 Zupa cebulowa z Goraja (Goraj onion soup) – 
 Zupa chłopska fajsławicka – soup with potatoes, kluski, fatback and dewlap
 Zupa z karpia (carp soup) – soup with carp, vegetables, ginger and seasonings
 Żur żukowski – żurek with meat, onion and vegetables

Fish dishes
 Karasie z Polesia (Polesia crucian carp) – fish steak with onion-mushroom stuffing
 Karp w śmietanie po poniatowsku – originating from Poniatowa; carp with onion and sour cream
 Kotlety rybne z Sygrów (Fish cutlet from Sygrów) – originating from Gmina Kodeń; cutlets from fresh fish (pike, tench, carp, or catfish) with garlic and seasoning

Pork and beef dishes
 Dzik w cieście – wild boar meat in bread cake
 Szynka nadwieprzańska – succulent, crumbly meat consistency
 Polędwica nadwieprzańska – dry, lightly moist meat
 Kaczka czarna nadziewana – duck with mince stuffing
 Kiełbasa nadwieprzańska – smoked pork kiełbasa

Stews, vegetable and potato dishes

 Chodelskie gołąbki z kiszonej kapusty – gołąbki with sauerkraut and kasza, with rapeseed oil
 Flaki piaseckie – tripe with marjoram and cream
 Karczmiskie pierogi z bobru – pierogi with laurel
 Kluski gryczane (Groat kluski) – kasza kluski
 Kulebiak generałowej Kickiej – crescent-shaped roast with lightly spicy mushrooms
 Kulebiak z Perkowic – yeast bake with meat-vegetable stuffing
 Lubelski forszmak – sweet and sour meat and sausage soup
 Parowańce brzozowickie (Brzozowica parowańce) – originating from the village Brzozowica Duża 
 Parowańce z serem (Parowańce with cheese) – pampuchy with cheese
 Parowańce z kaszą jaglaną (Parowańce with millet) – pampuchy with millet
 Parowańce żakowolskie (Żakowola parowańce) – pampuchy with lentil
 Pierogi lipniackie (Lipniaki pierogi) – pierogi with cabbage and mushrooms
 Pierogi nowodworskie – pierogi with brown kasza, raisins and minute amount of mint
 Pierogi olszewnickie (Olszewnica pierogi) – 
 Pierogi turowskie z soczewicą (Turów pierogi with lentils) –
 Pierogi zosinowskie (Zosinowo pierogi) – pierogi with buckwheat kasza
 Pierogi żakowolskie (Żakowola pierogi) – pierogi from yeast dough with apple stuffing
 Podcos – thick viand from cabbage, barley groats, dill and chives
 Pyzy polskowolskie (Polskowola pyzy) – pyzy with meat
 Słodkowska kapusta z grzybami – thick cabbage viand with mushrooms
 Tertuny brzozowickie – originating from the village Brzozowica Duża; kluski-like dish with potato and lentil stuffing
 Werbkowickie placki z soczewicy – flat, oval cakes with lentil stuffing
 Woleńskie kartoflaki – oval kluski with meat, topped with pork rind and roused with fat
 Zawijas nasutowski – "twist" with wheat dough and onion aroma
 Zawijoki janowickie – kluski-like dish with kasza and sauerkraut stuffing

Puddings

 Baba drożdżowa z jabłkami (Baba with apples) – yeast cake with apples
 Ciasto staropolskie podhoreckie (Old Polish Podhorce cake) – 
 Makowiec lubartowski (Lubartów makowiec) – plum-nut makowiec
 Marchwiaki z makiem – carrot rouladen with poppy seed
 Miodownik z Jaszczowka – honey cake
 Pieróg gryczany – kasza bake, sweet or savoury taste dependent on added ingredients
 Pralina z Lublina – raspberry-honey chocolate sweets
 Rudnicki pieróg jaglany – cake with honey and mint filling
 Sernik z kartoflami z Jaszczowa (Jaszczów potato cheesecake) – potato cheesecake
 Sękacz podlaski (Podlaskie sękacz) – pyramid cake, made of many layers; includes butter, egg whites, flour and cream
 Szarlotka józefowska (Józefów charlotte) – charlotte cake with an apple filling

See also
 Podlaskie cuisine
 Świętokrzyskie cuisine
 Galician cuisine
 List of Polish dishes

References

Polish cuisine
Lublin Voivodeship